Scutellarioideae is a subfamily of plants in the family Lamiaceae.

Genera include:
 Holmskioldia
 Renschia
 Scutellaria
 Tinnea
 Wenchengia

References

Lamiaceae
Asterid subfamilies